Cary Kennedy is an American politician from Colorado. She is a former Colorado State Treasurer, as well as a former Deputy Mayor and Chief Financial Officer of Denver, Colorado. She was also a candidate for Governor of Colorado in the 2018 election.

Biography
Kennedy was born in 1968 in Colorado. She attended Manual High School in Denver and holds a bachelor's degree from St. Lawrence University, a master's degree from Columbia University and a Juris Doctor degree from the University of Denver School of Law. She is not a member of the Kennedy political family.

Cary Kennedy worked as a budget analyst in Colorado Governor Romer's Office of State Planning and Budgeting and then as a fiscal analyst for the Colorado Department of Health Care Policy and Financing.

In 2006, Kennedy ran for the office of Colorado State Treasurer and won against her Republican opponent, former State Treasurer, Mark Hillman. She took office in January 2007.

Kennedy unsuccessfully ran for reelection in 2010, narrowly losing to her Republican opponent Walker Stapleton.

In April 2017, Kennedy announced her candidacy for Governor of Colorado in the 2018 election. She lost the Democratic primary election to U.S. Representative Jared Polis, who went on to win the general election, defeating her former Republican rival Walker Stapleton.

Electoral history

City and County of Denver
When Michael Hancock took over as mayor of Denver in July, 2011, he appointed Kennedy as the city's Chief Financial Officer. In August, 2011, he appointed her Deputy Mayor. Under Denver law, the Mayor appoints one of his department heads as Deputy Mayor. On January 13, 2014, Denver announced that it would be able to build the Central Denver Recreation Center using bond money, proceeds from the sale of Market Street Station and funds from the Tabor emergency fund. The total value of the rec center is $14.5 million, and the financial engineering to make it happen was led by Kennedy. However, the final cost of the recreation center (now called the Carla Madison Recreation Center) ended up being $44 million.

References

External links
Campaign Website

Colorado Democrats
Colorado lawyers
Living people
State treasurers of Colorado
Women in Colorado politics
1968 births
School of International and Public Affairs, Columbia University alumni
St. Lawrence University alumni
University of Denver alumni
21st-century American women